Hlynets is a Ukrainian village in Yavoriv Raion (district) of Lviv Oblast (province). It belongs to Yavoriv urban hromada, one of the hromadas of Ukraine. Until 1949 it was known as Liashky when it was renamed after a local creek Hlynets.

Notable people
Halyna Hereha, businesswoman and politician

References 

Villages in Yavoriv Raion